Quarteira ( or ) is a Portuguese civil parish, in the municipality (concelho) of Loulé in the Algarve. The population in 2011 was 21,798, in an area of 38.16 km².

History

The settlement of the region dates back to, at least, the Roman occupation of the Iberian Peninsula (at one time confused with the village of Carteia). There are still other authors who suggest that settlement of the region may have begun in the era of Phoenician or Carthaginian traders.

For several centuries, Quarteira was a modest fishing village, situated on the edge of a  beach, encircled by pines. King Denis authorized a foral (charter) for the settlement on 15 November 1297.

In the 15th century, King John I of Portugal ordered the first cultivation of sugar cane in continental Portugal.

Created in 1916, the civil parish quickly became known for its beaches, fishing and its forests of pine.

Quarteira was elevated to the status of cidade (city) on 13 May 1999.

Geography
Quarteira is a coastal civil parish, located along the southern extent of the Algarve fronting Albufeira Municipality to the west (in the parish of Olhos de Água). In addition, the local area authority is bordered in the east by Almancil, northeast by São Clemente, north by São Sebastião and Boliqueime.

From the Atlantic coast, the frontier with its neighbours extends northwest along the Ribeira de Algibre, before following the M526 municipal roadway to the Estrada Nacional EN125 in Maritenda. From here, the border travels southeast along the EN125 until just after the N396 motorway, where it then divides along a ravine southwest towards the Atlantic Ocean, alongside the Royal Golf Course. The coast includes  of normally-classified Blue Flag beach.

Economy

Golf remains a symbol for this parish, municipality, and region, with five distinct golf courses contributing to the economy, particularly during the off-season.

In relation to this sport, the parish is home to Vilamoura, Europe's largest private tourist facility. In addition, the region accommodates various tourists with two hundred hotels and residences, including casinos, bars and discos.

Architecture

Archaeological
 Roman ruins of Cerro da Vila

Civic
 Apartment Complex Avenida de Sagres, 147/149
 Apartment Complex Quarteira I
 Apartment Complex Rua de São Tomé e Príncipe, 26/36
 Fiscal Guard Post of Quarteira
 Lighthouse of Vilamoura
 Loulé-Praia de Quarteira Railway Station
 Maritime Delegation of Quarteira
 Residence Cada do Mirante
 Residence Gonçalves
 Residence Villa Sol e Mar
 Residence Casa Martins Laginha
 Restaurante-Residencial Toca do Coelho/Hotel D. José

Military
 Fort of Armação

Religious
 Church of Nossa Senhora da Conceição
 Church of São Pedro do Mar
 Church of Vilamoura

Culture
Among other festivities attracting tourism to the region is the Marchas Populares in June.

Town Twinning

Twin towns — Sister cities
The following place is Sister City to Quarteira :

 Vilamoura, Portugal

References

External links

Freguesias of Loulé
Seaside resorts in Portugal
Towns of the Algarve